Seagulls Over Sorrento is a 1960 Australian television play. It was based on the popular stage play Seagulls Over Sorrento and was produced by Crawford Productions for Melbourne's HSV-7, airing on 1 May 1960 as an episode of "ACI Theatre".  It screened on TCN-9 in Sydney on Sunday 12 June.

It was the first full-length TV play made by an independent production company in Australia, in his case Crawfords.

A kinescope recording of the production exists.

Cast
Bill Hodge as Badger
Brian James as Petty Officer Herbert
Stuart Wagstaff
Frank Taylor as AB Haggis MacIntosh
Peter Anderson as Lofty
Carl Bleazby
Don Crosby as AB Hudson
Mark Kelly
John Norman

Production
It was the second time live drama had appeared on HSV-7. The first was The Caine Mutiny Court Martial.

Hodge, James, Taylor and Bleazby had appeared in the 1952 J. C. Williamson's production of the play.<ref>"Advertisement: 'Seagulls Over Sorrento'." The Age', 18 June 1952, p. 20.</ref>  Hodge came out of semi retirement to star. It was reportedly the 594th time he had played the part.

The adaptation of the play was more faithful to its source material than the 1954 film version.

Reception
A critic from the Sydney Morning Herald "thought it came off pretty well as a TV show" with an "excellent cast".

The critic from The Age'' said "it was adequately presented but lacked atmosphere. The players were scared of the TV cameras for the first half hour."

References

External links
 

1960s Australian television plays